The year 1955 in architecture involved some significant architectural events and new buildings.

Events
 June – Outrage, a special issue of Architectural Review condemning the areas of British cities failed by urban planning, establishes the reputation of Ian Nairn as an architectural critic.
 December – Reyner Banham introduces the term "New Brutalism" into English print, writing in Architectural Review.
 Chinese American architect I. M. Pei establishes the architectural practice I. M. Pei & Associates with Eason H. Leonard and Henry N. Cobb in New York City.
 German architect Josef Bieling establishes the architectural practice Architekturbüro Josef Bieling in his hometown Kassel.

Buildings and structures

Buildings opened
 June 25 – Notre Dame du Haut in Ronchamp, France, designed by Le Corbusier, is dedicated.
 July 22 – Palace of Culture and Science in Warsaw, the tallest building in Poland (1955–present) and the second tallest in Europe (1955–1990), designed by Lev Rudnev.
 August – Hiroshima Peace Memorial Museum, Japan, designed by Kenzō Tange.

Buildings completed
 February – Bavinger House in Norman, Oklahoma, United States, the best-known building designed by Bruce Goff.
 MIT Chapel and Kresge Auditorium at Massachusetts Institute of Technology, Cambridge, Massachusetts, designed by Eero Saarinen.
 Chapel of Trinity College, Toronto, designed by Giles Gilbert Scott.
 Dominus Flevit Church, Jerusalem, designed by Antonio Barluzzi.
 Reconstructed Kinkaku-ji temple in Kyoto, Japan.
 Chandigarh High Court (Palace of Justice), Chandigarh Capitol Complex, India, designed by Le Corbusier.
 Southern Alberta Jubilee Auditorium in Calgary, Alberta.
 Northern Alberta Jubilee Auditorium in Edmonton, Alberta.
 Punta La Entallada Lighthouse on Fuerteventura, Canary Islands, designed by Carlos Alcon.
 Fundació Pilar y Joan Miró in Palma, Majorca, designed by Josep Lluís Sert.
 Tate & Lyle sugar silo, Liverpool, England.
 Casa Antonio Gálvez, Mexico City, designed by Luis Barragán.
 House Fox, Worcester, Western Cape, South Africa, designed by Revel Fox.
 Houses for self at 7 Gibraltar Hill and for E. W. Scorer, both in Lincoln, England, designed by Sam Scorer.
 House for John Womersley at Farnley Tyas, Yorkshire, England, designed by Peter Womersley.
 "Hermit's Castle", Achmelvich, Scotland, designed by David Scott.

Awards
 AIA Gold Medal – Willem Marinus Dudok.
 RIBA Royal Gold Medal – John Murray Easton.
 Grand Prix de Rome, architecture – Ngô Viết Thụ.

Births
 February 25 – Enric Miralles, Spanish Catalan architect (died 2000)
 April 14 – Robert Couturier, French architect and interior designer, designer of Cuixmala
 July 2 – Francine Houben, Dutch architect
 August 2 – Anne Lacaton, French architect
 November 17 – Amanda Levete, British architect
 date unknown
 Miroslav Grčev, Macedonian architect and graphic designer
 Alan Powers, British modern architecture and design historian

Deaths
 February 7 – Carl Rubin, Galician-born Israeli International Style architect (born 1899)
 April 16 – George Howe, American International Style architect and educator (born 1886)
 August 6 – Dominikus Böhm, German church architect (born 1880)
 November 29 – Rene Paul Chambellan, American architectural sculptor (born 1893)

References